Vesleskarvet is a nunatak on the west side of Ahlmann Ridge located in Queen Maud Land, Antarctica. Its western side consists of a series of cliffs, approximately 250 m high, while the eastern side slopes more gradually down to the icefields. The accessibility of the relatively level wind-swept snow-free summit made it ideal for the establishment of the permanent South African National Antarctic Programme research base SANAE IV.

It was mapped by Norwegian cartographers from surveys and air photos by the Norwegian-British-Swedish Antarctic Expedition (NBSAE) (1949–52) and air photos by the Norwegian expedition (1958–59) and named Vesleskarvet, meaning "the little barren mountain."

See also
Knerten Rock, an isolated rock 7 nautical miles (13 km) north of Vesleskarvet Cliff

References

South African National Antarctic Programme
Nunataks of Queen Maud Land
Princess Martha Coast